Group XIIA secretory phospholipase A2 is an enzyme that in humans is encoded by the PLA2G12A gene.

References

Further reading